Charu Asopa Sen is an Indian television actress and vlogger. She is known for portraying Revati in Devon Ke Dev...Mahadev Akhati Pari in the TV series Baalveer, Preeti in the TV series Mere Angne Mein and Piyali in the TV show Jiji Maa. Charu is often in news for her compatibility issues with her present husband Rajeev. The couple often give interviews against of each-other. . Charu also makes vlogs on YouTube based on her personal life.

Personal life
Charu firstly got married in Rajasthan with a marwari business man. Although she took divorce in November 2016 citing compatibility issues. Then Charu was in relationship with Neeraj Malviya. They got engaged  in Rajasthan. The couple called off engagement in 2017. In June 2019, she married Sushmita Sen's younger brother Rajeev Sen. It is Charu's second marriage. Rajeev Sen had blamed Charu publicly for hiding her first marriage in 2022. In July 2022, couple has announced that they have initiated the process for legal termination of marriage. Though they have called off the divorce in September, 2022 and announced the same on their respective Instagram handle. Although,  again in October 2022, Charu has accused Rajeev sen for physical abuse and confessed that marrying Rajeev was her biggest mistake.

Filmography

Films

Television

References

External links

Actresses from Rajasthan
People from Bikaner
Actresses in Hindi cinema
Actresses in Hindi television
Indian film actresses
Indian television actresses
21st-century Indian actresses
Living people
1988 births